The 1914 Chicago Maroons football team was an American football team that represented the University of Chicago during the 1914 college football season.  In their 23rd season under head coach Amos Alonzo Stagg, the Maroons compiled a 4–2–1 record, finished in second place in the Western Conference, and outscored all opponents by a combined total of 104 to 34.

Schedule

References

Chicago
Chicago Maroons football seasons
Chicago Maroons football